Class War is the second studio album by Pennsylvania hardcore punk band Wisdom In Chains. It was released in 2007 on Eulogy Recordings.

Track list

References

2007 albums
Wisdom in Chains albums